Hjem til gården 2017 (Home to the Farm 2017) is the first season of the Danish version of The Farm. 14 contestants from across Denmark come to the farm and live like it was 100 years ago. Each week, the head of the farm nominates one person to be in a duel, the nominee then chooses who they'll face off against in one of three challenges. The person who loses the duel is sent home but not before writing a letter delivered to the farm stating who the head of farm for the next week is. The winner wins a grand prize of 500,000 kr. The season premiered on 20 March 2017 and concluded on 22 May 2017 when Trine Cecile Enevoldsen won in the final duel against Jacob Grum-Schwensen to win the grand prize and become the first winner of Hjem til gården.

Finishing order
All contestants entered on Day 1.

Future Appearances
Søren Christiansen returned in Hjem til gården 2019 as a fighter competing for a spot to enter the farm.

The game

Notes

References

External links

The Farm (franchise)
Danish television series
2017 Danish television seasons